In probability theory and statistics, the Exponential-Logarithmic (EL) distribution is a family of lifetime distributions with
decreasing failure rate, defined on the interval [0, ∞).

Introduction 

The study of lengths of the lives of organisms, devices, materials, etc., is of major importance in the biological and engineering sciences. In general, the lifetime of a device is expected to exhibit decreasing failure rate (DFR) when its behavior over time is characterized by 'work-hardening' (in engineering terms) or 'immunity' (in biological terms).

The exponential-logarithmic model, together with its various properties, are studied by  Tahmasbi and Rezaei (2008).
This model is obtained under the concept of population heterogeneity (through the process of
compounding).

Properties of the distribution

Distribution 

The probability density function (pdf) of the EL distribution is given by Tahmasbi and Rezaei (2008)

The EL distribution has its modal value of the density at x=0, given by

The cumulative distribution function is given by

and hence, the median is given by
.

Moments 

The moment generating function of  can be determined from the pdf by direct integration and is given by
 

where  is a hypergeometric function. This function is also known as Barnes's extended hypergeometric function.

 

For
, the raw moments are given by

where  is the polylogarithm function which is defined as
follows:

Hence the mean and variance of the EL distribution
are given, respectively, by

The survival, hazard and mean residual life functions 

The survival function (also known as the reliability
function) and hazard function (also known as the failure rate
function) of the EL distribution are given, respectively, by

 

 

The mean residual lifetime of the EL distribution is given by

 

where  is the dilogarithm function

Random number generation 
Let U be a random variate from the standard uniform distribution.
Then the following transformation of U has the EL distribution with
parameters p and β:

Estimation of the parameters 
To estimate the parameters, the EM algorithm is used. This method is discussed by Tahmasbi and Rezaei (2008). The EM iteration is given by

Related distributions
The EL distribution has been generalized to form the Weibull-logarithmic distribution.

If X is defined to be the random variable which is the minimum of N independent realisations from an exponential distribution with rate parameter β, and if N is a realisation from a logarithmic distribution (where the parameter p in the usual parameterisation is replaced by ), then X has the exponential-logarithmic distribution in the parameterisation used above.

References

Continuous distributions
Survival analysis